Stirling City may refer to:

 The city of Stirling, Scotland, United Kingdom
Stirling City Choir, Scotland
Stirling City, California, United States

See also
Sterling City, Texas, United States